Reliance Bank Limited, formerly known as The Salvation Army Bank, was founded in 1890 by William Booth. When Booth needed to attract investments to finance mortgages on property vital to the work of the movement, his response was to set up a bank.

Today, The Salvation Army Trustee Company and The Salvation Army International Trustee Company still retain sole ownership of the bank and each year receive an equal share of the bank's allowable profits (a total of £12  million over the last 10 years). It is not only The Salvation Army which relies on the bank, but it is also used by many private customers, as well as other churches, charities, and businesses.

The Reliance Bank is not a clearing bank and uses the National Westminster Bank to act as its agents in this respect. It is registered with the UK financial services regulator, the FCA.

On 1st April 2021, Reliance Bank ceased offering Personal Current Accounts to new customers.

References

 Banks of the United Kingdom
 The Salvation Army
 Ethical banking
 Banks established in 1890